Tonto Basin Outlaws is a 1941 American Western film directed by S. Roy Luby. The film is the tenth in Monogram Pictures' "Range Busters" series, and it stars Ray "Crash" Corrigan as Crash, John "Dusty" King as Dusty and Max "Alibi" Terhune as Alibi, with Jan Wiley, Tris Coffin and Edmund Cobb.

Despite the film's title, the action takes place in Montana, not Arizona's Tonto Basin. Like the other of the Range Busters series, the film was shot at Corriganville Movie Ranch and used footage from silent Westerns.

Plot
After the Sinking of the Maine, the Range Busters enlist in the Rough Riders to fight in the Spanish–American War. They are disappointed they are to be mustered out due to Crash's familiarity with Montana in order to protect cattle herds and gold shipments meant for the Army that are being attacked. Denver reporter Jane Blanchard sees her chance to cover the troubles in Montana when all the young male reporters are in Washington or en route to the war fronts.

Working undercover in a Montana saloon owned by town boss Jeff Miller, Jane suspects first Crash, then Rusty of being one of the rustlers.

Cast
John "Dusty" King as "Dusty" King
Ray "Crash" Corrigan as Ray "Chipmunk" Corrigan
Max Terhune as "Alibi" Terhune
Elmer Sneezeweed as Elmer Sneezeweed 
Jan Wiley as Jane Blanchard
Tris Coffin as Jeff "Weasel" Miller
Edmund Cobb as Jim Stark
Art "Dustbowl" Fowler as Bill Brown
Rex Lease as Editor Stanley
Ted Mapes as Ricks
Reed Howes as Army Captain
Carl Mathews as Ed

Soundtrack
 John "Dusty" King – "Cabin of My Dreams" (Words and Music by John "Dusty" King and Jean George)

See also
The Range Busters series:

 The Range Busters (1940)
 Trailing Double Trouble (1940)
 West of Pinto Basin (1940)
 Trail of the Silver Spurs (1941)
 The Kid's Last Ride (1941)
 Tumbledown Ranch in Arizona (1941)
 Wrangler's Roost (1941)
 Fugitive Valley (1941)
 Saddle Mountain Roundup (1941)
 Tonto Basin Outlaws (1941)
 Underground Rustlers (1941)
 Thunder River Feud (1942)
 Rock River Renegades (1942)
 Boot Hill Bandits (1942)
 Texas Trouble Shooters (1942)
 Arizona Stage Coach (1942)
 Texas to Bataan (1942)
 Trail Riders (1942)
 Two Fisted Justice (1943)
 Haunted Ranch (1943)
 Land of Hunted Men (1943)
 Cowboy Commandos (1943)
 Black Market Rustlers (1943)
 Bullets and Saddles (1943)

External links

1941 films
1940s English-language films
American black-and-white films
1941 Western (genre) films
Monogram Pictures films
American Western (genre) films
Films set in Montana
Films directed by S. Roy Luby
Range Busters
1940s American films